Rod Laver successfully defended his title, defeating Martin Mulligan in the final, 6–2, 6–2, 6–1 to win the gentlemen's singles tennis title at the 1962 Wimbledon Championships.

Seeds

  Rod Laver (champion)
  Roy Emerson (fourth round)
  Neale Fraser (semifinals)
  Ramanathan Krishnan (third round)
  Chuck McKinley (second round)
  Manuel Santana (quarterfinals)
  Nicola Pietrangeli (third round)
  Bob Hewitt (quarterfinals)

Draw

Finals

Top half

Section 1

Section 2

Section 3

Section 4

Bottom half

Section 5

Section 6

Section 7

Section 8

References

External links

Men's Singles
Wimbledon Championship by year – Men's singles